Tara Thaller (born 31 March 1998) is a Croatian actress, known for the lead role in HBO's TV series Uspjeh (Success).

Personal life
Tara Filipović was born in 1998, in Zagreb, Croatia, and was raised alongside two siblings. Thaller was her great-grandmother's maiden name and Tara first used it informally on social media sites, before officially changing her last name after her first movie role. In 2017 she finished high school and tried to enter the Academy of Dramatic Art in Zagreb, but was unsuccessful. She started working in a fast food chain and preparing for the next year's entrance exam, resigning her position when she got the lead role in HBO's TV series Uspjeh (Success).

From the age of six, Thaller has been a vegetarian. She speaks English and some German and French; she plays the piano and knows how to dance. She has trained in skiing, swimming and horseback riding.

Career
After a few secondary roles in mostly Croatian movies and TV series, Thaller had a breakthrough with the lead role of Blanka in HBO's TV series Uspjeh (Success), aired in 2019. After that, she signed a contract for the Swiss movie The Saint of the Impossible which was filmed in New York in 2019, thus extending her international career which started with a small role in Ibiza the year before.

Although her career is currently focused on big screen and TV, she is very interested in theatre roles. Her biggest ambition is to play in a musical.

Filmography

Movies
 Ljubav ili smrt (Love or Death, 2014)
 Ibiza (2018)
 The Saint of the Impossible (2020)

Television
 Čuvar dvorca (Guardian of the Castle, 2017)
 Pogrešan čovjek (The Wrong Man, 2018-2019)
 Uspjeh (Success, 2019)

Dubbing
 Soy Luna (2018)
Raya and the Last Dragon (2021)

In the media
In 2018 Thaller appeared as a contestant in a Croatian quiz-show Volim Hrvatsku, and in spring 2019 she won the Croatian version of BBC's singing show Just the Two of Us in pair with Croatian singer Dino Jelusić.

References

External links
 Tara Thaller on IMDb

1998 births
Living people
Actresses from Zagreb